Warpak is a village development committee in Gorkha District in the Gandaki Zone of northern-central Nepal. It is centered on the village of Barpak. At the time of the 1991 Nepal census it had a population of 4,556 and had 888 houses.

Being close to the epicenter and lodged on a steep hillside, Barpak was extremely hard hit by the April 2015 Nepal earthquake.

References

Populated places in Gorkha District